Alcock's toad-headed agama (Phrynocephalus euptilopus), is a species of agamid lizard found in Pakistan and Afghanistan. The species was originally established based on just 6 specimens from Darband, Western Baluchistan. Only preserved specimens are currently on file with the last occurrence in July 1993.

References

euptilopus
Reptiles of Afghanistan
Reptiles of Pakistan
Taxa named by Alfred William Alcock
Taxa named by Frank Finn
Reptiles described in 1897